John Ryland "Twenty Percent" Davis (June 12, 1882 – August 16, 1947) was an American college football player. Davis was known as "Twenty percent" because he was considered twenty percent of the team's worth.

Georgia Tech
Davis was a tackle and halfback for John Heisman's Georgia Tech Golden Tornado of the Georgia Institute of Technology. He was inducted into the Tech Athletic Hall of Fame in 1958.  The large Davis carried the bass drum on his back in a parade through Griffin, Georgia for the Georgia Tech Glee Club.

1908
Davis was selected All-Southern in 1908.  Vanderbilt coach Dan McGugin wrote, "He has one glaring fault—a tendency to tackle around the eyebrows. Otherwise he is a splendid foot ball man. He weighs two hundred pounds, is never hurt, never fumbles, bucks a line hard and furnishes excellent interference. He was the strength and stay of Tech."

1909
He was captain of the 1909 team.

References

American football tackles
American football halfbacks
Georgia Tech Yellow Jackets football players
All-Southern college football players
1882 births
1947 deaths
Sportspeople from Williamsburg, Virginia
Players of American football from Virginia